MTA2: Baptized in Dirty Water is the third studio album by American rapper and record producer David Banner. It was released on December 23, 2003, by SRC Records and Universal Records, serving as his second studio release with SRC and Universal.

Track listing

Charts

Weekly charts

Year-end charts

References

2003 albums
Albums produced by David Banner
Albums produced by Mannie Fresh
David Banner albums
Sequel albums